Stade de San Pédro is a football stadium currently under construction in San Pédro, Ivory Coast. The stadium will have a capacity of 20,000 seats.

Construction of the stadium began in September 2018. The stadium is planned to host matches for the 2023 Africa Cup of Nations, an international men's football competition across Africa.

References

Football venues in Ivory Coast
Sport in Bas-Sassandra District

Buildings and structures in Bas-Sassandra District
2023 Africa Cup of Nations stadiums